Gonia capitata is a Palaearctic species of fly in the family Tachinidae.

Range
Europe, Mongolia, China, Russia (West Russia & Western Siberia), Caucasus.

Hosts
The larvae of Agrotis and Euxoa obelisca. One record from Ceramica pisi.

References

Diptera of Europe
Diptera of Asia
Insects described in 1776
Exoristinae
Taxa named by Charles De Geer